Black Creek  is a  tributary of Pochuck Creek in Sussex County, New Jersey in the United States.

See also
List of rivers of New Jersey

References

Rivers of New Jersey
Rivers of Sussex County, New Jersey
Tributaries of the Wallkill River